SQC may refer to:

 Southern Cross Airport (Western Australia) (IATA airport code: SQC), Southern Cross, Western Australia, Australia
 Singapore Airlines Cargo (ICAO airline code: SQC)
 Scottish Qualifications Certificate, the main educational qualification awarded to students in secondary, further, and, vocational education.
 Statistical Quality Control
 Standard on Quality Control of the Institute of Chartered Accountants of India
 Student Quality Circle, a type of quality circle

See also

 "SQC", aircraft prefix used by the Waco Aircraft Company
 "SQC", sonar system prefix used by naval weaponry of the People's Liberation Army Navy